The 1966 American Football League draft was held on Saturday, November 27, 1965. The AFL added the Miami Dolphins as an expansion team in 1966 to bring its total to nine franchises for its seventh season. The Dolphins were awarded the first overall pick in the draft, who used it to select running back Jim Grabowski. The only Hall of Famer to come out of this draft was kicker Jan Stenerud, who was picked by the Kansas City Chiefs in the third round of the Red Shirt portion of the draft.

This was the last competitive draft of the American Football League before the AFL–NFL merger agreement, which was announced in June 1966. The next draft of college players in 1967 was a common draft, held in mid-March.

The 1966 NFL Draft was held the same day, November 27, 1965.

Player selections (AFL)

Round one

*As an expansion team, Miami picked first in every round and was awarded an extra pick at the beginning of the draft.
*New York deferred its first round selection, taking the 13th pick instead of the 9th.
*Oakland deferred its selections until after the first six rounds and traded its sixth round pick. Its first round pick was made after the 7th round, 63rd overall. They made their second, third, and fifth round picks in the middle of the 7th round, so the first round pick was actually the fourth pick Oakland made.

Round two

*Oakland deferred its selections until after the first six rounds and traded its sixth round pick. Its second round pick was made during the 7th round, 57th overall. This was the first pick Oakland made in the draft.

Round three

*Oakland deferred its selections until after the first six rounds and traded its sixth round pick. Its third round pick was made during the 7th round, 58th overall. This was the second pick Oakland made in the draft.

Round four

*Oakland deferred its selections until after the first six rounds and traded its sixth round pick. Its fourth round pick was made during the 8th round, 71st overall. This was the fifth pick Oakland made in the draft.

Round five

*Oakland deferred its selections until after the first six rounds and traded its sixth round pick. Its fifth round pick was made during the 7th round, 59th overall. This was the third pick Oakland made in the draft.

Round six

*Oakland deferred its selections until after the first six rounds and traded its sixth round pick.

Round seven

*Oakland deferred its selections until after the first six rounds. Picks 57, 58, & 59 were deferred Oakland picks and are shown in rounds two, three, and five respectively.

Round eight

*Oakland deferred its selections until after the first six rounds. Pick 70 would have been Oakland's pick in the 8th round but was skipped. Pick 71 was a deferred Oakland pick and is shown in round four.

Round nine

Round ten

Round eleven

Round twelve

Round thirteen

Round fourteen

Round fifteen

Round sixteen

Round seventeen

Round eighteen

Round nineteen

Round twenty

Redshirt draft

Red Shirt Round one

Red Shirt Round two

Red Shirt Round three

Red Shirt Round four

Red Shirt Round five

Red Shirt Round six

Red Shirt Round seven

Red Shirt Round eight

Red Shirt Round nine

Red Shirt Round ten

Red Shirt Round eleven

Notable undrafted players

See also
 1966 NFL Draft

References

St. Petersburg Times – Top Pro Draft Selections – November 29, 1965 – page 3C
Milwaukee Sentinel – NFL, AFL Draft of College Football Players – November 29, 1965 – page 8, part 2
Pittsburgh Post Gazette – AFL Draft Selections – November 29, 1965 – page 38

External links
Pro Football Reference – 1966 AFL Draft
Pro Football Hall of Fame – 1966 Draft
Remember the AFL – 1966 Draft

1966
Draft
American Football League draft